The Vancouver Island Party (VIP) was a political party in British Columbia, Canada. Robin Richardson, a former Progressive Conservative Member of Parliament (1979–1980), led the party until November 2019. The party was formed on June 16, 2016.
The party proposes that Vancouver Island secede from British Columbia and become Canada's 11th province.

On December 31, 2020, the Vancouver Island Party was de-registered by Elections BC.

Provincial elections
The party intended to have candidates in each of the 14 ridings on Vancouver Island for the provincial election on May 9, 2017, but only fielded four, all in the Greater Victoria area. None of its candidates were elected.

It did not run any candidates in the 2020 British Columbia general election, but remained registered as a political party as of November 2020.

On December 31, 2020, the Vancouver Island Party was de-registered by Elections BC.

References

External links
 

Provincial political parties in British Columbia
Political parties established in 2016
Vancouver Island
Secessionist organizations in Canada
2016 establishments in British Columbia